Masters of Menace is a 1990 comedy film about a motorcycle gang.

Plot
The Masters of Menace are a motorcycle club. When one of their own dies while testing his top fuel Harley, they decide to cross the country to go bury him. With the coffin in the back of the pick-up truck and the tight-butt lawyer in the front, their craving for beer combined with lack of manners will disturb quite a few people wherever they go, including law enforcement.

Cast
 David Rasche as Buddy Wheeler
 Catherine Bach as Kitty Wheeler
 Tino Insana as Hank "Horny Hank"
 Lee Ving as Roy "Roy Boy"
 David Bowe as Joe "Sloppy Joe"
 Lonnie Parkinson as Frank "Fat Frank"
 Carol Ann Susi as Candy Colletti
 John Hazelwood as Larry "Lazy Larry"
 David L. Lander as "Squirt"
 C.E. Grimes as Chester
 Chris Oswald as "Wizard"
 Mike Petta as Mike
 Bill Reid as Bill
 Sam Turner as Sam
 Lance Kinsey as Wallace Wolfby
 Dan Aykroyd as Johnny Lewis
 Jim Belushi as "Gypsy"
 John Candy as Beer Truck Driver
 George Wendt as Dr. Jack Erheart
 Teri Copley as Sunny
 Ray Baker as Riley Hoover
 Malcolm Smith as Dick Schonweiller
 George Buck Flower as Sheriff Julip
 Robert Costanzo as Pilot
 Ron Taylor as Man At Door

Home media
The film was released on VHS in the United States by RCA/Columbia.

External links
 
 
 

1990 films
1990 comedy films
American comedy films
CineTel Films films
American independent films
1990 independent films
1990s English-language films
1990s American films